1 Samuel 23 is the twenty-third chapter of the First Book of Samuel in the Old Testament of the Christian Bible or the first part of the Books of Samuel in the Hebrew Bible. According to Jewish tradition the book was attributed to the prophet Samuel, with additions by the prophets Gad and Nathan, but modern scholars view it as a composition of a number of independent texts of various ages from c. 630–540 BCE. This chapter contains the account of David's escape from Saul's repeated attempts to kill him. This is within a section comprising 1 Samuel 16 to 2 Samuel 5 which records the rise of David as the king of Israel.

Text
This chapter was originally written in the Hebrew language. It is divided into 29 verses.

Textual witnesses
Some early manuscripts containing the text of this chapter in Hebrew are of the Masoretic Text tradition, which includes the Codex Cairensis (895), Aleppo Codex (10th century), and Codex Leningradensis (1008). Fragments containing parts of this chapter in Hebrew were found among the Dead Sea Scrolls including 4Q52 (4QSam; 250 BCE) with extant verses 8–23.

Extant ancient manuscripts of a translation into Koine Greek known as the Septuagint (originally was made in the last few centuries BCE) include Codex Vaticanus (B; B; 4th century) and Codex Alexandrinus (A; A; 5th century).

Old Testament references
:

Places 

Engedi
Gibeah
Hachilah
Keilah

David saved the city of Keilah (23:1–13)
The narrative describes how David acted like a good king to protect the territory of Israel from foreign aggressor (cf. 1 Samuel 9:16), although he was on the run from the actual king, Saul. At this time David was shown to have access to YHWH through the oracle (before the arrival of Abiathar and the ephod), so he inquired YHWH twice, once on his own initiative and a second time to calm his men's uncertainty, for David was given an encouraging response and an assurance of divine participation (verse 5). David's next inquiry with YHWH was by means of Abiathar and the ephod after the liberation of Keilah (verse 6), asking two questions: 'Will Saul come to Keilah? Will the inhabitants of Keilah betray him?' (verses 11–12; set out clearly in 4QSam compared to Masoretic Text) to obtain an affirmative answer to both. David and his men immediately left the city, thwarting Saul's plan to capture David easily in a closed-in town such as Keilah (Saul delusionally believed that God had 'given him' into his hand, following the Greek and Targum, in preference to the Masoretic Text which renders 'made a stranger of him'). Saul mustered a big army as he did before, but instead of directing it against foreign attackers (1 Samuel 11:7–8; 13:3–4), he misused 'the armies of the living God' (17:26) for his own selfish purpose, to capture David. However, it is clear in the narrative that David had an advantage over Saul: David had access to YHWH, whereas Saul didn't (1 Samuel 14:37).

Verse 1
Then they told David, saying, "Look, the Philistines are fighting against Keilah, and they are robbing the threshing floors."
"Keilah": was designated as a city of Judah (Joshua 15:44), not far from the Philistines' territory ('in the recesses of the Philistines', verse 3 of Septuagint instead of 'against the armies of the Philistines' in NRSV), so it was of interest to both Israelites and Philistines.

David in wilderness strongholds (23:14–29)

David left Keilah with six hundred soldiers (up from 400 people in 1 Samuel 22) to move from place to place, avoiding Saul's pursuit. When David was in Ziph, which was on the edge of the wilderness of Judah, Jonathan met him to reaffirm the pact between them that Jonathan was content with being second to David, so now David has the priesthood and the house of Saul behind him. However, as verses 19–23 show, David was still in constant danger, as the local people where he stayed with (the Ziphites) were willing to deliver him into Saul's hand and provided the necessary information  Although David was acknowledged by Saul as 'cunning' in escaping, he was eventually cornered when reaching 'the wilderness of Maon' (verse 24), southwards of Hebron, that Saul and his troops were 'closing in' on him from both sides. David was saved at a critical moment because Saul was informed of a Philistine attack that he had to face as the king of Israel, and so he had to abandon his plan to capture David.

Verse 28
Therefore Saul returned from pursuing David, and went against the Philistines; so they called that place the Rock of Escape.
"Rock of Escape": or "Rock of Parting" (possibly denoting that Saul and David parted company at that place), from Hebrew (as fully spelled in KJV) "Selahammahlekoth" which can also be rendered as "Rock of Separation".

See also

Related Bible parts: 1 Samuel 20, 1 Samuel 21, 1 Samuel 22

Notes

References

Sources

Commentaries on Samuel

General

External links
 Jewish translations:
 Shmuel I - I Samuel - Chapter 23 (Judaica Press). Hebrew text and English translation [with Rashi's commentary] at Chabad.org
 Christian translations:
 Online Bible at GospelHall.org (ESV, KJV, Darby, American Standard Version, Bible in Basic English)
 1 Samuel chapter 23. Bible Gateway

23